"Love Will Tear Us Apart" is a song by English rock band Joy Division, released in June 1980 as a non-album single. Its lyrics were inspired by lead singer Ian Curtis's marital problems and struggles with epilepsy. The single was released the month after his suicide.

The song was certified platinum in the UK, selling over 600,000 copies, and has an ongoing legacy as a defining song of the era. In 2002, NME named "Love Will Tear Us Apart" as the greatest single of all time, while Rolling Stone named it one of the 500 best songs ever in 2004, 2011, and 2021.

Background
"Love Will Tear Us Apart" was written about Ian Curtis' troubled relationship with his wife, Deborah Woodruff, whom he married in August 1975. Additionally, it deals with his own struggles with epilepsy, which he was diagnosed with in 1979, and the overwhelming stress of holding down a day job and his growing career as a singer.

At a Joy Division gig in October 1979, Curtis met Belgian journalist and music promoter Annik Honoré and the two began a relationship, which caused further distress between Curtis and Woodruff.

Speaking about her relationship with Curtis in a 2010 interview with Belgian magazine supplement Focus, Honoré said:

Recording
Joy Division first recorded "Love Will Tear Us Apart" at Pennine Studios, Oldham, on 8 January 1980, along with the B-side, "These Days". This version was similar to the version the band played live. However, singer Ian Curtis and producer Martin Hannett disliked the results and the band reconvened at Strawberry Studios, Stockport in March to re-record it. Drummer Stephen Morris recalled:

The guitar on the recording, a 12-string Eko guitar, was played by Bernard Sumner. While Curtis generally did not play guitar, to perform the song live, the band taught him how to strum a D major chord. Sumner said:

While Joy Division were recording, U2 were in the studio to see Hannett about producing their single "11 O'Clock Tick Tock". U2 singer Bono said of the encounter:

Releases
It was first recorded for a John Peel session in November 1979, then re-recorded in January 1980 and March 1980. It is the latter version that appears on the 1988 Substance album. The January 1980 version, which has become known as the "Pennine version", originally appeared as one of the single's B-sides.

"Love Will Tear Us Apart" became Joy Division's first chart hit, reaching number 13 in the UK Singles Chart. The following month, the single topped the UK Indie Chart. The song also peaked at number 42 on the Billboard disco chart in October 1980. "Love Will Tear Us Apart" also reached number 1 in New Zealand in June 1981.

The single was re-released in 1983 and reached number 19 on the UK charts and number 3 in New Zealand during March 1984. In 1985, the 7" single was released in Poland by Tonpress in different sleeve under licence from Factory and sold over 20,000 copies. In November 1988, it made one more Top 40 appearance in New Zealand, peaking at number 39.

Cover photo
According to Curtis's wife Deborah, to create the single cover photo, the song title was etched upon a sheet of metal; this was aged with acid and exposed to the weather to create the appearance of a stone slab. For the 12" version of the single, a photograph of a grieving angel on the Ribaudo family tomb in Genoa's Monumental Cemetery of Staglieno (sculpted by Onorato Toso  1910) was used. The photograph was taken by Bernard Pierre Wolff in 1978.

Music video
The video was shot by the band themselves on 25 April 1980 as they rehearsed the song at T. J. Davidson's studio, in Knott Mill, Manchester city centre, where the band had previously rehearsed during the early days of their career. At the start of the video, the door that opens and shuts is carved with Ian Curtis' name; reportedly this was the beginning of an abusive message (the rest later erased) carved into the door.

Due to poor production, the video's colour is 'browned out' at some points. Also, as the track recorded during the recording of the video was poor, it was replaced with the single-edit recording of the song by the band's record company in Australia, leading to problems with the synchronisation of music and video. This edited version of the music video would later become the official version due to the improvement of sound quality. The audio issue would be fixed in the 1995 remaster.

This was the only promotional video the band ever produced as Ian Curtis hung himself three weeks after the video was recorded.

Legacy

"Love Will Tear Us Apart" was named NME Single of the Year in 1980, and was listed as the best single of all time by NME in 2002.

In May 2007, NME placed it at number 19 in its list of the 50 Greatest Indie Anthems Ever, one place ahead of another Joy Division song, "Transmission". The song is also listed as being one of the 5 best indie songs of all time in the "All Time Indie Top 50".

In 2004, the song was listed by Rolling Stone magazine at number 179 in its list of the "500 Greatest Songs of All Time". In 2011, the song was listed at number 181. In the 2021 update of the list, it had risen to 41.

The song reached number 1 in the inaugural Triple J Hottest 100 music poll of 1989 and again in 1990. When being interviewed for New Order Story, Neil Tennant of the Pet Shop Boys stated that "Love Will Tear Us Apart" was his favourite pop song of all time. At Christmas 2011, listeners of Dublin's Phantom FM voted "Love Will Tear Us Apart" as their favourite song of all time. Furthermore, in 2012, in celebration of the NMEs 60th anniversary, a list of the 100 Greatest Songs of NMEs Lifetime was compiled, and the list was topped by "Love Will Tear Us Apart". Serbian rock musician, journalist and writer Dejan Cukić wrote about "Love Will Tear Us Apart" as one of the 45 songs that changed history of popular music in his 2007 book 45 obrtaja: Priče o pesmama. In 2015, the online magazine Pitchfork ranked "Love Will Tear Us Apart" seventh on its list of the "200 best songs of the 1980s".

Following Curtis's suicide, his wife Deborah had the phrase "Love Will Tear Us Apart" inscribed on his memorial stone.

In June 2013, Mighty Box Games released Will Love Tear Us Apart?, a browser-based video game that adapts every verse of the song into a level.

Track listing

Track 1 recorded at Strawberry Studios, Stockport, early March 1980
Tracks 2 and 3 recorded at Pennine Sound Studios, Oldham, 8 January 1980
In her biography Touching from a Distance, Deborah Curtis explains that the reason for the two versions of the song, one on each side, was a result of Curtis's slightly different singing in each one; one vocal take was allegedly done when other band members told Curtis to sing "like Frank Sinatra".
Like other Joy Division releases, including Transmission and An Ideal For Living, the 7" and 12" versions share the same tracks, but have different sleeves.

Charts

Weekly charts

Year-end charts

Certifications

Cover versions

Throughout the eighties, multiple artists covered "Love Will Tear Us Apart". Chuzpe recorded a cover version that peaked at number eight in Austria in 1981. Paul Young's 1984 cover "Love Will Tear Us Apart" reached number nine in both the Belgium and Netherlands, and number 40 in Germany. The New York band Swans' fourth EP Love Will Tear Us Apart was named after their cover of the song, and was placed alongside two semi-acoustic versions of songs from their 1987 LP Children of God. The EP reached number 85 on the UK Singles Chart and number two on the UK Indie Chart. In May 2005, ambient dance duo Honeyroot reached number 70 on the UK Singles Chart in May 2005 with their cover.

See also
Joy Division discography
List of number-one singles from the 1980s (New Zealand)

References

External links

Usage in film and television: see "Joy Division. Soundtrack. 'Love Will Tear Us Apart'" at IMDb
Accolades archived at Acclaimed Music

1980 songs
1980 singles
1986 singles
1995 singles
2007 singles
Albums produced by Michael Gira
Factory Records singles
Joy Division songs
London Records singles
Number-one singles in New Zealand
Song recordings produced by Martin Hannett
Songs written by Bernard Sumner
Songs written by Ian Curtis
Songs written by Peter Hook
Songs written by Stephen Morris (musician)
Paul Young songs
Swans (band) EPs
Swans (band) songs
UK Independent Singles Chart number-one singles